Touko Valio Laaksonen (8 May 1920 – 7 November 1991), pseudonym Tom of Finland, was a Finnish artist who made stylized highly masculinized homoerotic art, and influenced late 20th-century gay culture. He has been called the "most influential creator of gay pornographic images" by cultural historian Joseph W. Slade. Over the course of four decades, he produced some 3,500 illustrations, mostly featuring men with exaggerated primary and secondary sex traits, wearing tight or partially removed clothing.

Early life
Laaksonen was born on 8 May 1920 and raised by a middle-class family in Kaarina, a town in southwestern Finland, near the city of Turku. Both of his parents Suoma and Edwin Laaksonen were schoolteachers at the grammar school that served Kaarina. The family lived in the school building's attached living quarters.

He went to school in Turku and in 1939, at the age of 19, he moved to Helsinki to study advertising. In his spare time he also started drawing erotic images for his own pleasure, based on images of male laborers he had seen from an early age. At first he kept these drawings hidden, but then destroyed them "at least by the time I went to serve the army." The country became embroiled in the Winter War with the USSR, and then became formally involved in World War II, and he was conscripted in February 1940 into the Finnish Army. He served as an anti-aircraft officer, holding the rank of second lieutenant. He later attributed his fetishistic interest in uniformed men to encounters with men in army uniform, especially soldiers of the German Wehrmacht serving in Finland at that time. "In my drawings I have no political statements to make, no ideology. I am thinking only about the picture itself. The whole Nazi philosophy, the racism and all that, is hateful to me, but of course I drew them anyway—they had the sexiest uniforms!" After the war, in 1945, he returned to studies.

Laaksonen's artwork of this period compared to later works is considered more romantic and softer with "gentle-featured shapes and forms". The men featured were middle-class, as opposed to the sailors, bikers, lumberjacks, construction workers, and other members of stereotypically hypermasculine working class groups that feature in his later work. Another key difference is the lack of dramatic compositions, self-assertive poses, muscular bodies and "detached exotic settings" that his later work embodied.

Career

In 1956 Laaksonen submitted drawings to the influential American magazine Physique Pictorial, which premiered the images in the 1957 Spring issue under the pseudonym Tom, as it resembled his given name Touko. In the Winter issue later that year, editor Bob Mizer coined the credit Tom of Finland. One of his pieces was featured on the Spring 1957 cover, depicting two log drivers at work with a third man watching them. Pulled from the Finnish mythology of lumberjacks representing strong masculinity, Laaksonen emphasized and privileged "homoerotic potentiality [...] relocating it in a gay context", a strategy repeated throughout his career.

The post-World War II era saw the rise of the biker culture as rejecting "the reorganization and normalization of life after the war, with its conformist, settled lifestyle." Biker subculture was both marginal and oppositional and provided postwar gay men with a stylized masculinity that included rebelliousness and danger. This was in contrast to the then-prevailing stereotypes of gay man as an effeminate sissy, as seen in vaudeville and films going back to the first years of the industry. Laaksonen was influenced by images of bikers as well as artwork of George Quaintance and Etienne, among others, that he cited as his precursors, "disseminated to gay readership through homoerotic physique magazines" starting in 1950. Laaksonen's drawings of bikers and leathermen capitalized on the leather and denim outfits which differentiated those men from mainstream culture and suggested they were untamed, physical, and self-empowered. This in contrast with the mainstream, medical and psychological sad and sensitive young gay man who is passive. Laaksonen's drawings of this time "can be seen as consolidating an array of factors, styles and discourses already existing in the 1950s gay subcultures," this may have led to them being widely distributed and popularized within those cultures. Starting his professional career in 1958 as a creative executive in renown marketing agency, McCann Helsinki, further encouraged his creativity.

U.S. censorship codes (1950s–1960s) 
Laaksonen's style and content in the late 1950s and early 1960s was partly influenced by the U.S. censorship codes that restricted depiction of "overt homosexual acts". His work was published in the beefcake genre that began in the 1930s and predominantly featured photographs of attractive, muscular young men in athletic poses often shown demonstrating exercises. Their primary market was gay men, but because of the conservative and homophobic social culture of the era, gay pornography was illegal and the publications were typically presented as dedicated to physical fitness and health. They were often the only connection that closeted men had to their sexuality. By this time, however, Laaksonen was rendering private commissions, so more explicit work was produced but remained unpublished. Aside from his work at the advertising agency, Laaksonen operated a small mail-order business, distributing reproductions of his artwork around the world by post, though he did not generate much income this way.

In the 1962 case of MANual Enterprises v. Day the United States Supreme Court ruled that nude male photographs were not inherently obscene. Softcore gay pornography magazines and films featuring fully nude models, some of them tumescent, quickly appeared and the pretense of being about exercise and fitness was dropped as controls on pornography were reduced. By the end of the 1960s the market for beefcake magazines collapsed. Laaksonen was able to publish his more overtly homoerotic work and it changed the context with "new possibilities and conventions for displaying frontal male nudity in magazines and movies." Laaksonen reacted by publishing more explicit drawings and stylized his figures' fantastical aspects with exaggerated physical aspects, particularly their genitals and muscles. In the late 1960s he developed Kake, a character appearing in an ongoing series of comics, which debuted in 1968.

Gay mainstream appeal (1970s–1991) 
With the decriminalization of male nudity, gay pornography became more mainstream in gay cultures, and Laaksonen's work along with it. By 1973, he was publishing erotic comic books and making inroads to the mainstream art world with exhibitions. In 1973 he gave up his full-time job at the Helsinki office of advertising agency McCann. "Since then I've lived in jeans and lived on my drawings," is how he described the lifestyle transition which occurred during this period.

By the mid-1970s he was also emphasizing a photorealistic style, making aspects of the drawings appear more photographic. Many of his drawings are based on photographs, but none are exact reproductions of them. The photographic inspiration is used, on the one hand, to create lifelike, almost moving images, with convincing and active postures and gestures while Laaksonen exaggerates physical features and presents his ideal of masculine beauty and sexual allure, combining realism with fantasy. In Daddy and the Muscle Academy – The Art, Life, and Times of Tom of Finland examples of photographs and the drawings based upon them are shown side by side. Although he considered the photographs to be merely reference tools for his drawings, contemporary art students have seen them as complete works of art that stand on their own.

In 1979, Laaksonen, with businessman and friend Durk Dehner, co-founded the Tom of Finland Company to preserve the copyright on his art, which had been widely pirated. In 1984 the Tom of Finland Foundation was established to collect, preserve, and exhibit homoerotic artwork. Although Laaksonen was quite successful at this point, with his biography on the best-seller list, and Benedikt Taschen, the world's largest art book publisher reprinting and expanding a monograph of his works, he was most proud of the Foundation. The scope of the organization expanded to erotic works of all types, sponsored contests, exhibits, and started the groundwork for a museum of erotic art.

Death 
Laaksonen was diagnosed with emphysema in 1988. Eventually the disease and medication caused his hands to tremble, leading him to switch media from pencil to pastel. He died in 1991 of an emphysema-induced stroke.

Private life

Laaksonen's life partner was the dancer Veli “Nipa” Mäkinen who shared his life for 28 years, until Mäkinen's death in 1981.

Reception
During his lifetime and beyond, Laaksonen's work has drawn both admiration and disdain from different quarters of the artistic community. Laaksonen developed a friendship with gay photographer Robert Mapplethorpe, whose work depicting sado-masochism and fetish iconography was also subject to controversy.

A controversial theme in his drawings was the erotic treatment of men in Nazi uniforms. They form a small part of his overall work, but the typically flattering visual treatment of these characters has led some viewers to infer sympathy or affinity for Nazism, and they have been omitted from most recent anthologies of his work. Later in his career Laaksonen disavowed this work and was at pains to dissociate himself and his work from fascist or racist ideologies. He also depicted a significant number of black men in his drawings, with no overt racial or political message in the context in which they appear; although they bear some commonality with racist caricatures of the "hypersexual" black male, these traits are shared by Laaksonen's white characters as well.

Sheila Jeffreys offers a radical feminist critique of Laaksonen's work in her 2003 book Unpacking Queer Politics.

Art critics have mixed views about Laaksonen's work. His detailed drawing technique has led to him being described as a "master with a pencil", while in contrast a reviewer for Dutch newspaper Het Parool described his work as "illustrative but without expressivity".

There is considerable argument over whether his depiction of "supermen" (male characters with huge sexual organs and muscles) is facile and distasteful, or whether there is a deeper complexity in the work which plays with and subverts those stereotypes.  For example, some critics have noted instances of apparent tenderness between traditionally tough, masculine characters, or playful smiles in sado-masochistic scenes.

In either case, there remains a large constituency who admire the work on a purely utilitarian basis; as described by Rob Meijer, owner of a leathershop and art gallery in Amsterdam, "These works are not conversation pieces, they're masturbation pieces."

Writing for Artforum, Kevin Killian said that seeing Tom of Finland originals "produces a strong respect for his nimble, witty creation". Kate Wolf writes that "Tom of Finland helped pave the way to gay liberation".

Cultural impact and legacy
In 1995, Tom of Finland Clothing Company introduced a fashion line based on his works, which covers a wide array of looks besides the typified cutoff-jeans-and-jacket style of his drawings. The fashion line balances the original homoeroticism of the drawings with mainstream fashion culture, and their runway shows occur in many of the venues during the same times as other fashion companies.

In 2009, Laaksonen was inducted into the Leather Hall of Fame.

Some of his original works are at the Leather Archives and Museum.

Exhibitions
New York's Museum of Modern Art has acquired several examples of Laaksonen's artwork for its permanent collection. In 2006, MoMA in New York accepted five Tom of Finland drawings as part of a much larger gift from The Judith Rothschild Foundation. The trustee of The Judith Rothschild Foundation, Harvey S. Shipley Miller, said, "Tom of Finland is one of the five most influential artists of the twentieth century. As an artist he was superb, as an influence he was transcendent." Hudson, of Feature Inc., New York, placed Tom of Finland's work in the collections of Rhode Island School of Design Museum of Art and Art Institute of Chicago. His work is also in the public Collections of: The Museum of Contemporary Art (MOCA), Los Angeles, USA; Wäinö Aaltonen Museum of Art; Turku, Finland; University of California Berkeley Art Museum, Berkeley (California), USA; Los Angeles County Museum of Art, Los Angeles, USA; Kiasma, Museum of Contemporary Art, Helsinki, Finland; San Francisco Museum of Modern Art, San Francisco, USA; and Tom of Finland Foundation, Los Angeles, USA.

In 1999, an exhibition took place at the Institut Culturel Finlandais (Finnish Cultural Centre) in Paris.

In 2011 there was a large retrospective exhibition of Laaksonen's artwork in Turku, Finland. The exhibition was one of the official events in Turku's European Capital of Culture programme.

In 2012, Kulturhuset presented a retrospective, Tom of Finland, in Stockholm, Sweden; and Tom of Finland's work was in the Robert Rauschenberg Foundation's We the People in New York City, USA.

In 2013, MOCA presented Bob Mizer & Tom of Finland in Los Angeles, USA. The artist's work was also seen in HAPPY BIRTHDAY Galerie Perrotin – 25 years in Lille, France; Leslie Lohman Museum's Rare and Raw in New York City, USA; and the Institute of Contemporary Art's Keep Your Timber Limber (Works on Paper) in London, England.

In 2015, Artists Space presented the exhibition "Tom of Finland: The Pleasure of Play" in New York City, USA. The exhibition was also presented in Kunsthalle Helsinki in 2016, complemented with additional material such as photos from family albums.

In 2020, as part of the 100th birthday celebrations, "Tom of Finland: Love and Liberation" at London's House of Illustration showed 40 originals with ephemera emphasizing fashion as an aspect of his work.

Film

In 1991, Filmitakomo and Yleisradio produced a documentary film, Daddy and the Muscle Academy, directed by Ilppo Pohjola. By the late 1980s, Laaksonen was well known in the gay world, but his "pneumatically muscled, meticulously rendered monster-donged icons of masculinity" received mainstream attention when the film – which includes hundreds of images of his work along with interviews – was released theatrically in Finland, won a Finnish Jussi Award in 1992, and was shown at film festivals and film art houses worldwide. While praising the artwork's quality one critic noted the film's lauding of Laaksonen as a gay pride icon while ignoring his work's "resemblance to both S & M pornography and Fascist art" which she tied to Laaksonen's early sexual experiences with German soldiers during World War II.

Filmmaker Wes Hurley credits Tom of Finland as an influence in his work, including his short Peter and the Wolf and his cult comedy musical Waxie Moon in Fallen Jewel.

Variety announced in 2013 that Finnish director Dome Karukoski was set to make a biopic of Laaksonen, entitled Tom of Finland. Helsinki-filmi produced it and secured exclusive rights. The film, released in February 2017 in Finland, is the first biopic of the artist.

Stamps

In September 2014 the Finnish postal service, Itella Posti, published a set of three first class stamps featuring drawings by Laaksonen and in association with the stamps' release exhibited some of his correspondence at the Finnish Postal Museum. Two of the stamps include portions of an illustration of a nude man sitting between the legs of another man dressed as a police officer; the other depicts nude buttocks with a man's face included between the thighs. The stamp set exceeded Posti's expectations, with pre-orders from 178 countries, making it the best-selling stamp set in the service's history.

Videography
Ilppo Pohjola (author): Kari Paljakka and Alvaro Pardo (producers): Daddy and the Muscle Academy: Tom of Finland. Filmitakomo & YLE, Finland 1991. (Duration of Feature: 58 Minutes. Also features frames of Laaksonen's graphic art.)

See also
 Bara (genre)
 Beefcake magazines
 ONE National Gay & Lesbian Archives

Notes

References
 
 
 

 Ramakers, Mischa. Dirty Pictures: Tom of Finland, Masculinity and Homosexuality. New York: St. Martin's Press, 2001. 
 
 Tom of Finland: The Art of Pleasure. Mischa Ramakers, ed. London: Taschen, 1998, 
 Tom of Finland: The Comic Collection. Vol. 1–5. Dian Hanson, ed. London: Taschen, 2005.

Further reading

External links
 
Grave of Touko Laaksonen
Tom of Finland Foundation

1920 births
1991 deaths
Fetish artists
Finnish cartoonists
Finnish erotic artists
Gay male BDSM
Gay male erotica artists
Leather subculture
LGBT comics creators
Finnish gay artists
People from Kaarina
Pseudonymous artists
Finnish military personnel of World War II
Deaths from emphysema
Respiratory disease deaths in Finland
20th-century Finnish LGBT people
20th-century Finnish male artists